New Douglas Park, currently known as the ZLX Stadium for sponsorship purposes, is a football stadium in Hamilton, South Lanarkshire, Scotland, which serves as the home of Scottish Championship side Hamilton Academical and Scottish League One side Clyde. It takes its name from Douglas Park, the club's former stadium which was located immediately to the south of the current site.

Stadium
The stadium is located in the north of Hamilton, close to the Burnbank and Whitehill residential areas and to Hamilton West railway station. Construction of the stadium was completed by Ballast Nedam in 2001; the initial intention was for its name to be The Ballast Stadium.

The pitch was converted to artificial FieldTurf in 2004, the more durable surface allowing the club to hold training sessions and youth academy matches there without damaging the playing field for first team matches. After Hamilton was promoted to the Scottish Premier League in May 2008, the artificial surface had to be replaced by grass due to league rules, an alteration which owner Ronnie MacDonald claimed had cost £850,000 (including the installation of undersoil heating). In addition to the turf replacement, a small temporary stand with a capacity of 500 was erected in March 2008 to bring the stadium's capacity up to the league requirement of 6,000 all seater.

At the beginning of season 2013–14, Hamilton returned to an artificial playing surface, this time produced by TigerTurf with an installation cost of £400,000. In June 2018, that surface was voted as the worst of 42 SPFL venues in a survey of the league's players. The following day, the club made public their intention to install a new Greenfields surface in time for the 2018–19 season, costing £750,000 and with the same specification as the SFA performance centre at Oriam.

In July 2016 it was announced that as part of a £750,000 sponsorship deal, New Douglas Park would be renamed the SuperSeal Stadium after a deal was agreed with Glasgow-based home improvements company SuperSeal. In July 2018 it became the Hope CBD Stadium following another sponsorship deal with a firm providing cannabidol products owned by the club's chief executive Colin McGowan. In July 2019 it changed again to the Fountain of Youth Stadium in another sponsorship deal worth £750,000.

During the 2013–14 season, Albion Rovers played Scottish Cup ties against Motherwell and Rangers at the stadium.

In April 2022, Clyde F.C. announced they would be leaving Broadwood Stadium at the end of the 2021–22 season, ending their 28-year stay in Cumbernauld. They will be ground-sharing at New Douglas Park from the start of the 2022–23 season, with a view of relocating to a new home back in Glasgow in the near future.

Records
The stadium's record attendance of 6,007 was set on 17 January 2015 when Hamilton played Celtic in a Scottish Premiership game.

See also
 Scottish stadium moves

References

External links

Stadium Virtual Tour
Football Stadium Guide Article
Scottish Grounds Article

Football venues in Scotland
Hamilton Academical F.C.
Sports venues in South Lanarkshire
Buildings and structures in Hamilton, South Lanarkshire
Scottish Premier League venues
Scottish Football League venues
Scottish Professional Football League venues
Sports venues completed in 2001
Scottish Women's Premier League venues